The 1952 Panamerican Championship was the first edition of the Panamerican Championship, an association football tournament featuring national teams from North, Central and South America. Organized by the Panamerican Football Confederation, this first edition was held in Santiago, Chile, between March 16 and April 20, in 1952.

The competition, contested by six teams, was played in a round-robin format, and won by Brazil. All the matches were played at Estadio Nacional.

Teams
South America (Conmebol)
 
 
 
 

Central America (CCCF)
 

North America (NAFC)

Venue

Results

Match details

Table

Top goalscorers

References

1952
1952 Pan
1952 Pan
1952 in South American football
1952 in Chilean football
March 1952 sports events in South America
April 1952 sports events in South America
1950s in Santiago, Chile